Diplotaxis gracilis is a species of wall rockets that belong to the family Brassicaceae. The species is endemic to Cape Verde and is listed as endangered by the IUCN.  The plant was named by Otto Eugen Schulz in 1916. The local name of the plant is mostarda-brabo (wild mustard).

Distribution and ecology
Diplotaxis gracilis is found only in the island of São Nicolau, between 600 and 1,200 meters elevation. It occurs on steep slopes in the Monte Gordo Natural Park.

References

gracilis
Endemic flora of Cape Verde
Flora of São Nicolau, Cape Verde
Taxa named by Otto Eugen Schulz